This is a list of rural localities in Kamchatka Krai. Kamchatka Krai is a federal subject (a krai) of Russia. It is geographically located in the Far East region of the country, and it is administratively part of the Far Eastern Federal District. Kamchatka Krai has a population of 322,079 (2010).

Aleutsky District 
Rural localities in Aleutsky District:

 Nikolskoye

Milkovsky District 
Rural localities in Milkovsky District:

 Milkovo

Olyutorsky District 
Rural localities in Olyutorsky District:

 Korf
 Tilichiki

Penzhinsky District 
Rural localities in Penzhinsky District:

 Kamenskoye
 Paren'

Sobolevsky District 
Rural localities in Sobolevsky District:

 Sobolevo

Tigilsky District 
Rural localities in Tigilsky District:

 Tigil
 Ust-Khayryuzovo

Ust-Bolsheretsky District 
Rural localities in Ust-Bolsheretsky District:

 Ust-Bolsheretsk

Ust-Kamchatsky District 
Rural localities in Ust-Kamchatsky District:

 Klyuchi
 Ust-Kamchatsk

See also 
 
 Lists of rural localities in Russia

References 

Kamchatka Krai